Sufetula sunidesalis is a moth in the family Crambidae. It was described by Francis Walker in 1859. It is found on Borneo and in India (Sikkim, Assam), Sri Lanka and Malaysia.

Adults are cinereous (ash grey) speckled with brown. The wings are partly shaded with pale brown and speckled with darker brown. The exterior line is whitish and the marginal line is dark brown. The forewings have whitish marks along the costa and a blackish apical spot, as well as a whitish interior line.

References

Moths described in 1859
Spilomelinae